Lingua: An International Review of General Linguistics is a peer-reviewed academic journal covering general linguistics that was established in 1949. It is published by Elsevier and the editor-in-chief is Marta Dynel (University of Lodz).

History
In October 2015 the editors and editorial board resigned en masse to protest their inability to come to an agreement with Elsevier regarding fair pricing models for open access publishing. They subsequently started a new journal, Glossa, whereas Elsevier continued Lingua under new leadership.

Abstracting and indexing
The journal is abstracted and indexed in:

According to the Journal Citation Reports, the journal has a 2021 impact factor of 0.916.

References

External links

Linguistics journals
Elsevier academic journals
Publications established in 1949
English-language journals
Journals published between 13 and 25 times per year
Hybrid open access journals